Pechora is a town in the Komi Republic, Russia.

Pechora may also refer to:
 Pechera, Ukraine, Russian: Pechora, Romanian: Peciora, village in the Vinnytsia Oblast of Ukraine, located along the Southern Bug river in the Tulchin region (formerly Shpikov region)
 Pechora concentration camp located in Pechera, Ukraine from 1941-1944.
 Pechora Airport (IATA: PEX, ICAO: UUYP) is an airport in the Komi Republic, Russia
 Pechora Kamenka is a military air base in the Komi Republic, Russia
 S-125 Neva/Pechora, NATO reporting name SA-3 Goa, is a Soviet surface-to-air missile system
 Pechora Radar Station in the Komi Republic, Russia.
 Pechora (river) is a major river in Russia (Komi Republic and Nenets Autonomous Okrug)
 Pechora Sea is a sea at the northwest of Russia, the southeastern part of the Barents Sea
 Pechora pipit (Anthus gustavi) is a small passerine bird breeding in tundra
 Pechora is the NATO reporting name for Daryal radar

See also
Pecora (disambiguation)
Pechory, town in Pskov Oblast, Russia.